The East Roman or Byzantine Empire established and operated several mints throughout its history (330–1453). Aside from the main metropolitan mint in the capital, Constantinople, a varying number of provincial mints were also established in other urban centres, especially during the 6th century. Most provincial mints except for Syracuse were closed or lost to invasions by the mid-7th century. After the loss of Syracuse in 878, Constantinople became the sole mint for gold and silver coinage until the late 11th century, when major provincial mints began to re-appear. Many mints, both imperial and, as the Byzantine world fragmented, belonging to autonomous local rulers, were operated in the 12th to 14th centuries. Constantinople and Trebizond, the seat of the independent Empire of Trebizond (1204–1461), survived until their conquest by the Ottoman Turks in the mid-15th century.

History
The original Roman mint network was reorganized and centralized by Emperor Diocletian at the end of the 3rd century, parallel to the restructuring of the Roman Empire's provincial and fiscal administration. The mints were limited to one per diocese (except for a few exceptions) and placed under the dual control of the praetorian prefectures and the comes sacrarum largitionum. During the next two centuries, some mints were closed and others opened as fiscal necessity or administrative changes dictated. In addition, the various emperors had mints attached to their retinue (comitatus) which followed them on their journeys and campaigns throughout the Roman Empire. After a law promulgated in 366/369, the minting of precious-metal coins was confined to these comitatensian mints, operating either from a permanent base or by making use of the regional mints nearest to the current location of the emperor and his comitatus. Otherwise, regional mints were mostly limited to issuing base-metal coins.

During the course of the 5th century, the Roman minting system collapsed. The western half of the Roman Empire was overrun by Germanic tribes, although some mints remained active in the West under the new barbarian rulers and continued to mint coins, including high-quality gold solidi, in the name of the eastern emperors, most notably in Ostrogothic Italy and Burgundy. In the East, most mints seem to have been active until some time into the reign of Zeno, but by the accession of Anastasius I only the mints of Constantinople and Thessalonica remained active. In 498, Anastasius initiated a major coinage reform—carried out by the comes sacrarum largitionum John the Paphlagonian—which is held to mark the start of the "Byzantine" coinage system proper. At the same time, he re-opened the mints at Nicomedia and later at Antioch. The number of mints expanded greatly during the reign of Justinian I, in large part due to his reconquest of Italy, Africa, and parts of Spain. As many as fourteen mints were active during Justinian's reign, with new mints opened or taken over from the Vandals and Ostrogoths in Carthage, Rome, Ravenna, Carthagena, and in smaller provincial centres. Most of these were confined to copper coinage. Ravenna and Carthage alone produced silver coins in quantity, while gold issues were restricted to Catania, Thessalonica, and Constantinople; the latter two cities, however, far outstripped the others in output.

The territorial losses of the early 7th century, with the Byzantine–Sassanid War of 602–628, the Slavic incursions into the Balkans, and the onset of the Muslim conquests, drastically diminished the number of active mints. In 628/629, Emperor Heraclius closed all remaining provincial mints in the East except for Alexandria, which fell to the Arabs in 641. In the West too, one by one the cities hosting the various mints fell to various enemies, until by the 9th century, only Syracuse remained.

With the fall of Syracuse in 878, Constantinople remained the sole mint for gold and silver coinage until the late 11th century. The provincial mint at Cherson was reopened c. 860, but its output was restricted to copper coinage. Thessalonica became the main provincial mint after it reopened in the second half of the 11th century, and other provincial centres—Thebes or Corinth in southern Greece, Philadelphia in the 14th century, Magnesia and Nicaea during the Empire of Nicaea (1204–1261)—were active at times during the Byzantine Empire's last centuries. Usurpers or semi-autonomous local lords also occasionally established mints of their own, like Isaac Komnenos of Cyprus, Leo Gabalas of Rhodes, or the Gabras family of Trebizond. Constantinople, however, remained the main mint, providing the bulk of the coinage.

List (principal mints in bold)

References

Sources

Mints
Numismatics-related lists
Byzantine Empire